Burirdanga Union is a Union parishad of Mongla Upazila, Bagerhat District in Khulna Division of Bangladesh. It has an area of 48.95 km2 (18.90 sq mi) and a population of 14,623.

References

Unions of Mongla Upazila
Unions of Bagerhat District
Unions of Khulna Division